Ergo: An Open-Access Journal of Philosophy is an annual peer-reviewed open access academic journal of philosophy. It publishes papers on all philosophical topics and from all philosophical traditions. It is published by Michigan Publishing services and the editors-in-chief are Ben Bradley (Syracuse University), Kevan Edwards (Syracuse University), Nicholas Jones (University of Oxford), Nin Kirkham (University of Western Australia), Anne Schwenkenbecher (Murdoch University), and Alastair Wilson (University of Birmingham). Ergo was mentioned by the Leiter Reports blog as one of the best general philosophy journals in 2022. The journal is abstracted and indexed in the Arts & Humanities Citation Index and Current Contents/Arts & Humanities.

See also
List of philosophy journals

References

External links

Philosophy journals
English-language journals
Publications established in 2014
Annual journals